Tatiana Kirillovna Okunevskaya (3 March 1914 – 15 May 2002) was a Soviet and Russian actress.

Life
Okunevskaya was born in Zavidovo, Moscow Governorate, in 1914. She was active in Soviet film and theatre from 1933 to 1948, whereupon she was raped by Lavrentiy Beria at his residence, arrested for alleged anti-state agitation and propaganda, and sentenced to ten years labour at Steplag. Beria picked her up under the pretense of bringing her to perform for the Politburo. Instead, he took her to his dacha where he offered to free her father and grandmother from NKVD prison if she submitted. He then raped her telling her "scream or not, it doesn't matter." Beria already knew her relatives had been executed months earlier. Okunevskaya was arrested shortly after the encounter and sentenced to solitary confinement in the Gulag, which she survived.

Following her release in 1954, she returned to the theatre, where she worked until 1959. From 1959 to 1979, she worked as an artist for Gosconcert (the Soviet State Concert Company) and Mosconcert (its Moscow equivalent). Her previously robust health declined rapidly due to complications from surgery in 2000, ending in her death in Moscow in 2002 at the age of 88.

Selected filmography
 Hectic Days (1935)
 It Happened in the Donbas (1945)
 The Captivating Star of Happiness (1975)
 House for the Rich (2000)

References

External links
 
 

1914 births
2002 deaths
People from Konakovsky District
People from Moscow Governorate
Russian nobility
Soviet actresses
Gulag detainees
Inmates of Lefortovo Prison
Honored Artists of the RSFSR
Burials at Vagankovo Cemetery
Rape in Russia
Lavrentiy Beria